The Women's 56 kg powerlifting event at the 2004 Summer Paralympics was competed  on 21 September. It was won by Fatma Omar, representing .

Final round

21 Sept. 2004, 14:30

References

W
Para